Geoffrey II, de Château-Landon (died 1043 or 1046) was the Count of Gâtinais. He was the son of Hugues du Perche, Count of Gâtinais, by Béatrice de Mâcon, the daughter of Aubry II de Mâcon.  About 1035 he married Ermengarde of Anjou, Duchess of Burgundy, daughter of Fulk III, Count of Anjou. After Geoffrey's death she married secondly Robert I, Duke of Burgundy.

Issue
Together, Geoffrey and Ermengarde had:
Hildegarde de Château-Landon, married c.1060 to Joscelin I, Lord of Courtenay; his famous son was Joscelin I, Count of Edessa by a different partner.
Geoffrey III (1040 - 1096)
Fulk IV (1043 - 1109)

References

 
Medieval French nobility
1040s deaths
Year of birth unknown
Year of death uncertain